Ameer is a 1954 Bollywood film starring Geeta Bali.

Music

References

External links
 

1954 films
1950s Hindi-language films
Films scored by Lachchiram Talwar
Indian black-and-white films